Virgina is a 1991 Yugoslav drama film directed by Srđan Karanović.

Plot
The action of the film takes place at the end of the 19th century, in a remote village of Kninska Krajina. At that time, it was the province of Dalmatia in the Austro-Hungarian Empire.

Families without male offspring were considered cursed and doomed. In order to save from the curses, those families declared one of the female children a "virgin", i.e. man, hiding the truth as a family secret. The film follows the story of one such family. The film begins with the birth of another girl in a family that, as they say, was not lucky enough to have male children. The girl's father Timothy, who carries a gun almost the entire time in the film, takes his daughter to the field to kill her, but takes pity and decides to raise her as a boy. So Timothy, the head of his family, decided that his youngest daughter should become a virgin named Stevan. A girl grows up like a boy, accustomed from the first steps to nullify everything feminine in her. But when she enters her first girlhood, she falls in love with a young man...

You can see that "Stevan" shows his will to be something else when he avoids his fiancee, when he is attracted to Mijat, and when he wants to play with his sister's doll. The doll is the antithesis of the gun: although Stevan's mother keeps pushing the gun into Stevan's hands, she steals her sister's doll, hides it, and even lies that she didn't take it. In one scene Mijat suggests "Stevan" to pee together and measure whose penis is bigger. After "Stevan" refuses, his sister mocks him: "Piss if you're a man." After that, a scene is shown where "Stevan" runs out of the yard and urinates in a crouching position.

At the end of the film, Stevan breaks his vow and runs away with Mijat to the United States, daring to escape the patriarchal oppression to which sworn virgins are exposed.

Cast 
 Marta Keler as Stevan
 Miodrag Krivokapić as Timotije
 Ina Gogalova as Dostana
 Slobodan Milovanović as Paun
 Mirko Vlahović as Young Man
 Matija Prskalo as Oldest Sister
 Vjenceslav Kapural as Josip
 Nada Gačešić-Livaković as Ranka 
 Andrijana Videnović as Laura

References

External links 

1991 drama films
1991 films
Yugoslav drama films